Fork Township is a township in Marshall County, Minnesota, United States. The population was 14 at the 2000 census.

Fork Township was organized in 1896, and named for a fork in the river.

Geography

Demographics
As of the census of 2000, there were 14 people, 6 households, and 3 families residing in the township. The population density was 0.5 people per square mile (0.2/km2). There were 11 housing units at an average density of 0.4/sq mi (0.2/km2). The racial makeup of the township was 100.00% White.

There were 6 households, out of which 16.7% had children under the age of 18 living with them, 50.0% were married couples living together, and 50.0% were non-families. 33.3% of all households were made up of individuals, and 33.3% had someone living alone who was 65 years of age or older. The average household size was 2.33 and the average family size was 3.00.

In the township the population was spread out, with 21.4% under the age of 18, 21.4% from 18 to 24, 14.3% from 25 to 44, 28.6% from 45 to 64, and 14.3% who were 65 years of age or older. The median age was 36 years. For every 100 females, there were 250.0 males. For every 100 females age 18 and over, there were 266.7 males.

The median income for a household in the township was $31,250, and the median income for a family was $31,250. Males had a median income of $17,083 versus $11,250 for females. The per capita income for the township was $5,868. There are 40.0% of families living below the poverty line and 31.6% of the population, including none of the under eighteens and none of those over 64.

References

Townships in Marshall County, Minnesota
Townships in Minnesota